Tori Amos is an American pianist and singer-songwriter whose musical career began in 1980, at the age of seventeen, when she and her brother co-wrote the song "Baltimore". The song was selected as the winning song in a contest for the Baltimore Orioles and was recorded and pressed locally as a 7" single. From 1984 to 1989, Amos fronted the synth-pop band Y Kant Tori Read, which released one self-titled album with Atlantic Records in 1988 before breaking up. Shortly thereafter, Amos began writing and recording material that would serve as the debut of her solo career. Still signed with Atlantic, and its UK counterpart East West, Amos' initial solo material was rejected by the label in 1990. Under the guidance of co-producers Eric Rosse, Davitt Sigerson and Ian Stanley, a second version of the album was created and accepted by the label the following year.

Amos' solo career began in October 1991 with the UK release of the Me and a Gun EP. The following month, after the first track on the EP was receiving more airplay than the title track, the label reissued the EP with the same artwork, but changed the title to Silent All These Years. Although the second version of the EP reached only number 51 on the UK chart, BBC Radio 1 picked it as "Record of the Week", which helped Amos get her initial exposure. Her debut solo album, Little Earthquakes, was released two months later in January 1992. The album peaked at number 14 on the Australian and UK Albums Chart and at number 54 on the Billboard 200. Upon its release, the album received mostly positive reviews and was labeled an important album that kick-started the female singer-songwriter movement of the 1990s. Despite reaching only number 54 on the Billboard 200, Little Earthquakes was a mainstay on the chart for 38 weeks and remains Amos' highest-selling album in the United States.

Subsequent albums with Atlantic were released at approximately two-year intervals. Amos' sophomore effort, Under the Pink, co-produced with Eric Rosse, debuted in February 1994 at number 12 on the Billboard 200 and number 1 on the UK Albums Chart. Boys for Pele, Amos' third solo album and the first album that was self-produced, debuted in January 1996 at number 2 on both the US and UK charts, making it her highest simultaneous trans-Atlantic debut. From the Choirgirl Hotel, Amos' first album written and recorded with bandmates Matt Chamberlain on drums, Jon Evans on bass and Steve Caton on guitar, and her first album recorded at her in-home recording studio, Martian Engineering, debuted in May 1998 at number 5 on the Billboard 200 and at number 6 on the UK Albums Chart. The following year, To Venus and Back, a double album of studio and live material recorded with Chamberlain, Evans and Caton, debuted in September 1999 at number 12 in the US and at number 22 in the UK. In September 2001, Strange Little Girls, a covers album recorded with Chamberlin on drums, Evans and Justin Meldal-Johnsen on bass and Adrian Belew on guitar, debuted at number 4 on the Billboard 200 and at number 16 on the UK Albums Chart.

Due to professional conflicts, after working with Atlantic for the first 15 years of her career, Amos decided to seek another label. She joined Epic Records and released three albums over the next five years: Scarlet's Walk in October 2002, The Beekeeper in February 2005 and American Doll Posse in May 2007. On all three albums, Amos performed with Chamberlin on drums, Evans on bass and Mac Aladdin on guitar. Each album debuted in the Top 10 of the Billboard 200, placing Amos in an elite group of women who have secured five or more Top 10 album debuts.
Amos negotiated an end to her contract with Epic following the release of American Doll Posse, announcing in 2008 that she will be operating independently of record labels. In early 2009, Amos signed a distribution, or joint-venture, deal with Universal Republic Records, a division of Universal Music Group, which granted her greater creative control over her work than traditional recording contracts. Amos released two albums her first year under the contract: Abnormally Attracted to Sin in May 2009 and the seasonal album Midwinter Graces, featuring reworked Christmas carols and some original songs, in November 2009. Abnormally Attracted to Sin is Amos's seventh album to debut on the US Top 10 on the Billboard 200. Amos followed up with her first classical music album, Night of Hunters, recorded with Andreas Ottensamer of the Berlin Philharmonic and the award-winning string quartet, Apollon Musagète. Night of Hunters was released in September 2011, through the Deutsche Grammophon label, the classical music division of Universal Music Group. With Night of Hunters, Amos made Billboard history by being the first female artist to have an album place in the Top 10 of the Classical, Alternative, and Rock charts simultaneously.

To date in her solo career, Amos has recorded and released a total of 16 solo studio albums, multiple live releases, three compilation albums, one of which is a five-disc box set released through Rhino Entertainment, and numerous singles and EPs. Amos has contributed to numerous film soundtracks as well.

with Y Kant Tori Read

Solo

Studio albums

Extended plays
Although all of Amos' singles released by Atlantic were in an EP-style format, only two of her releases are labeled as such. To date, Scarlet's Hidden Treasures and Christmastide are Amos' only EPs completely comprising non-LP tracks.

Compilations

Live albums

Official bootlegs

Singles

Notes

B-sides
Early in her career Amos released many CD singles in conjunction with her albums—so many that a book called Tori Amos Collectibles was published in 1997 cataloging her worldwide releases, test pressings and bootlegs to that date. One of Amos' best selling early releases is the five-track Crucify EP. Amos' penchant for including non-album B-sides on each of her singles was a major factor in her initial popularity, particularly her cover of the Nirvana song "Smells Like Teen Spirit" from the aforementioned EP, which garnered significant press attention and critical praise. Many of Amos' B-sides are featured on the box set A Piano: The Collection (2006). With the production of CD singles becoming less common in the music business around the turn of the century, Amos has released far fewer B-sides since her contract with Epic Records began. As a result, B-sides for Scarlet's Walk were released through the internet and on an EP titled Scarlet's Hidden Treasures (2004), the sole B-side for The Beekeeper was released as on the DVD included in the album's limited edition version, and B-sides for American Doll Posse were distributed depending on packaging and place of purchase.

Below is an alphabetical list of all of Amos' known B-sides, including information on initial and subsequent releases.

Video albums

Music videos

Musical contributions

Soundtracks and cast recordings

Tributes

Other contributions

Side projects

References
General

 
 

Specific

External links
Official Tori Amos website (Full LP discography)
[ AllMusic listing]

Discography
Alternative rock discographies